Vitreolina bermudezi is a species of sea snail, a marine gastropod mollusk in the family Eulimidae.

References

bermudezi
Gastropods described in 1933